In Verbis Virtus is a downloadable adventure video game developed by the Italian video game developer Indomitus Games. It is early access for release on May 22, 2014, for Microsoft Windows. In Verbis Virtus is a first-person game where the player uses a microphone to cast spells by actually reciting the incantation. It mixes action and puzzle elements in a fantasy setting.

Gameplay
While playing In Verbis Virtus, the player finds themselves completely unarmed in a dark dungeon with several dangers. The only way to overcome the obstacles is to learn magic through inscriptions that they find along their path. The magic formulas found, if pronounced correctly, enable the player to perform various spells. The spells are used to solve puzzles, overcome traps and kill enemies.

Language
The developers created a fantasy language for the game called Maha'ki. The meaning of Maha'ki is "language of the gods", where "maha" means "creator deities" and "ki" means "voice, language".

Reception 
The game received little attention from the reviewing press so far. It was rated 80% by Multiplayer.it and 65% by Everyeye.it. Therefore, no Metacritic aggregate score is available to date.

Trivia 
Voice controlled spell casting is integrated using PocketSphinx speech recognition engine from CMUSphinx.

External links
In Verbis Virtus page
IGN Preview
Multiplayer.it

References 

2015 video games
Action video games
Fantasy video games
First-person shooters
Games for Windows certified games
Indie video games
Puzzle video games
Single-player video games
Unreal Engine games
Video games about magic
Video games developed in Italy
Early access video games
Windows games
Windows-only games